
Warawara (Aymara warawara star, Hispanicized spellings Huara Huara, Huarahuara),  often spelled Wara Wara, is a lake in the Tunari National Park in Bolivia. It is located in the Cochabamba Department, Chapare Province, Sacaba Municipality. Warawara lies north east of the city Cochabamba and north of Alalay Lake. The lake is situated 4,105 metres (13,468 ft) high. It is 0.8 km long and 0.5 km at its widest point.

References

See also
 List of lakes of Bolivia

Lakes of Cochabamba Department
Dams in Bolivia